The following is a list of the areas in England and Wales which became rural sanitary districts when the Public Health Act 1875 came into force in 1875. Sanitary districts were based on poor law unions, and frequently contained areas in more than one county.Note for table: 'RSD' stands for Rural Sanitary District, 'LGD' stands for Local Government District, 'MB' stands for Municipal Borough and 'CB' stands for County Borough.

1875

Previous rural sanitary districts
RSDs abolished prior to 1894 were:

See also
Rural districts formed in England and Wales 1894–1974
Local boards formed in England and Wales 1848–94
List of rural and urban districts in England in 1973
List of rural and urban districts in Wales in 1973

Sources
 F A Youngs, Guide to the Local administrative Units of England
 County Census Reports 1901–1931

 
History of local government in England
19th century in England
20th century in England
Rural society in the United Kingdom